Cirrhophanus dyari is a moth in the family Noctuidae (the owlet moths) first described by Theodore Dru Alison Cockerell in 1899. It is found in North America.

The MONA or Hodges number for Cirrhophanus dyari is 9765.

References

Further reading

External links
 

Amphipyrinae
Articles created by Qbugbot
Moths described in 1899